Vidyodaya Vibhushana Sahithya Kala Shiromani Prof. Sunil Ariyaratne Kuruwita Bandara (සුනිල් ආරියරත්න; born 28 July 1949), popularly as Sunil Ariyaratne, is a Sri Lankan scholar, film director, author, poet and a lyricist. One of the most popular filmmakers and lyricists in Sri Lankan cinema, Ariyaratne has won six Sarasaviya awards, four Presidential awards from the year 1981 as a film lyricist and then won three awards as a teledrama lyricists.

Personal life
He was born on 28 July 1949 in Nugegodaas the fourth child of the family with 6 siblings. He completed education from St. John's College, Nugegoda. He has three brothers and two sisters. His brothers, Nimal Kuruwita Bandara is a lawyer and Thilakaratne Kuruwita Bandara is a journalist and editor.

He sat for General Certificate of Education (GCE) Ordinary Level in 1963. After passing senior examination, he was selected to Vidyodaya Pirivena (currently known as University of Sri Jayewardenepura) for higher studies. In 1971, he obtained a Sinhala honours degree with a first class.

He worked as a temporary lecturer at University of Kelaniya in 1972. Then he served as a Part time lecturer at The Department of Aesthetics studies at Kelaniya university from 1975 to 1976. He moved to University of Jaffna as a Lecturer of Sinhala in 1976 and worked as a lecturer for three years. Then he returned to Kelaniya as a permanent Assistant lecturer. In 1985, Ariyaratne joined the academic staff at the University of Sri Jayewardenepura where he was promoted as an Assistant Professor and became a professor in 1994. In 1989 he traveled to Madras to study Tamil. In 2000, he was promoted as a Senior Professor of Sinhala Language and Mass Media in the Communication Faculty, becoming the youngest to achieve the feat in Sri Lanka university system.

In 2011, he was awarded Doctorate in Literature from Kelaniya University. In 2015, he was honored with second Doctorate in Literature in recognition of his contributions in the field of literature and the arts.

Career
At the age of 11, he wrote a school play named Amal Biso. Then, in 1961 at the age of 16, Ariyaratne published a collection of short stories called Ähinsakayo. Then in 1963, he wrote a poetry collection called Api Okkoma, historical novel Alakeshwara in 1964 and a poetic tale Siyothunta Rekawal in 1965. He produced the play Deyyo which was written by his elder brother Thilakaratne Kuruwita Bandara.

While as an undergraduate at Vidyodaya, Ariyaratne polished his ability where he wrote a novel Jeewithaya Geethayak Wewa in 1969. After graduating in 1971, he published a poetry book, Dolosmahe Pahana along with closest friends Buddadasa Galappaththi and Jayalath Manoratne. He wrote several lyrics such as Pahan Kanda (1983), Yathra (1984), Pembara lanka (1990), Madhu Badun (1994), Adaheraya (2004) and Shwetha Rathriya (2012). He is an accomplished lyricist who wrote several songs for popular artists such as Nanda Malini, W.D. Amaradeva and Victor Rathnayake. Some popular lyrics made by Ariyaratne include: Me guru pare, Podiduwage sina welai, Buddhanu Bhawena, Oba themei kiya bayyai, Api ethata ethata pa nagala, Viyo ge gayana, Yalu bala sande and Ane kurulu kooduwata gahanna ape.

In 1970, Ariyaratne excelled his career towards cinema direction by producing first short film Sara Gee and then Dushkara Kriya in 1976. His maiden cinema direction came through 1978 full-length feature film Anupama. With the help of Ranjith Palansuriya, Ariyaratne produced two blockbuster films, Sarungale (1979) and Siribo Aiya (1980). As an author, he won a State literary award for the book on Baila and Kapirigngna. In 1985, he wrote several research papers and publications on "Gramophone Era", "Kerol Pasam Kantharu", "Mahinda Prabanda", "Manawasinghe Geetha Prabanda", "Purana Sinhala Nadagam", "Gandarwa Apadana", "Sinhala Chithrapati Geethawali". In 1991, he wrote book Demala Sahithya Ithihasaya and then translated Tamil folktales Ramayanaya  in 1994. He also translated the Garcia Lorca's play Yerma along with Ediriweera Sarachchandra.

In 2002, he directed the dramatic movie Sudu Sewaneli. The film won the Sarasaviya award for the Best Director and President's Medal for the Best Script of that year.

In 2008, he released a volume Visithuruya Re Ahasa which contained all his lyrics written for films, teleplays, social events such as the Tsunami devastation, light songs for radio, cassettes and CDs. He directed the film Uppalavanna in 2008 which was based on a reinterpreted Buddhist story similar to a Theri gatha story. The film was a blockbuster of that year and won several awards at local film festivals including Most popular actress, best actress and music direction. However, the movie received primarily negative reviews. Many criticized the various unnecessary characters in the movie which do not have any role in the plot, the editing, and the acting.

In 2012, he directed the film Kusa Pabha based on the 523rd story "Kusa Jataka" in the Jataka story series. The film won 12 awards at 2013 Derana Lux Film Festival including popular actor, actress, movie, music direction, and singer.

In 2018, Ariyarante directed a historical story of Bimba Devi Alias Yashodara. It was screened on 26 April, at 85 cinema halls becoming the biggest number of the simultaneous screening in Sri Lanka. The film received mostly positive reviews from the critics.

In 2019, he directed the blockbuster film Vijayaba Kollaya which was released on 1 August in 80 cinema halls across the island. The film was an adaptation of W.A. Silva's novel of the same name. The film received positive reviews.

On 17 March 2020, he launched the second volume of Gandharwa Apadana where 06 books written on 12 musicians.

Awards and accolades
 1996 Sumathi Awards – Best Television Lyrics award for Sankranthi Samaya
 2002 Sarasaviya Awards – Best Film award for Sudu Sewaneli
 2004 Sumathi Awards – Best Television Lyrics award for Ramya Suramya
 2010 Sumathi Awards – U.W. Sumathipala memorial award
 2011 Raigam Tele'es – Best Television Lyrics award
 2018 Hiru Golden Film Awards – Best Lyrics award for Paththini
 2019 Derana Sunsilk Film Awards – Blockbuster Movie of the Year award for Bimba Devi Alias Yashodhara

Filmography

As director

As lyricist

References

Sinhala articles
 කලා සයුර කිමිද ජීවිතය සොයා ගිය ජ්‍යෙෂ්ඨ මහාචාර්ය සුනිල් ආරියරත්න
 සැරද සුලකළ’කුරු මියුරු තෙපලෙන් රඳනා
 මගේ ප්‍රේම ගීත කලාව
 මා ඇතුලු අප කිසිම කෙනෙක් පරම පාරිශුද්ධ මිනිසුන් නොවේ
 විජයබා කොල්ලය කියන්නේ මහාර්ඝ මාණික්‍යයක්
 විජය බා කොල්ලය ආයෝජනයක්
 දොළොස් මහේ පහන දල්වා 49 වසරකට පසු
 සුනිල් ආරියරත්න ආරණ්‍ය­වාසී මුනිවරයෙක් නොවන ශාස්ත්‍රවන්තයා
 කලාත්මක චිත්‍රපට කිරීම සියදිවි නසා ගැනීමක්
 “පිළිමනෙලා නැති” වැනි ගීත ලිව්වේ 71 පරපුරට – සුනිල් ආරියරත්න
 වසර තුනක් මේ පිට­පත කපා­කොටා සකස් කළා
 තිස්ස අබේසේකරගේ සුනිල් ආරියරත්න

External links
 Sunil Ariyaratne: Sooriya Records
 Kavsilumina or Guttila Kaavya?
 University students evince artistic and literary skills
 Eagle Excellence Awards 2008
 From Bimba Devi to Wijayaba Kollaya
 Curtain comes down on Sinhala Cinema?
 ‘ House full’ for ‘Yashodhara ’

1949 births
Living people
Sri Lankan poets
Sri Lankan lyricists
Sri Lankan film directors
Sinhalese writers
Alumni of St. John's College, Nugegoda
Alumni of the University of Sri Jayewardenepura
Academic staff of the University of Sri Jayewardenepura